Pseudorhysopus is a genus of beetles in the family Carabidae, containing the following species:

 Pseudorhysopus kabakovi Kataev & Wrase, 2001
 Pseudorhysopus suensoni Kataev & Wrase, 2001

References

Harpalinae